A tholos (pl. tholoi, from Ancient Greek θόλος), in Latin tholus (pl. tholi), is an architectural feature that was widely used in the classical world. It is a round structure, usually built upon a couple of steps (podium), with a ring of columns supporting a domed roof. 

In Roman cities they could often be found in the center of the macellum (meat market), where they might have been where fish were sold. Other uses for the central tholos have been suggested, such as the place where official weights and measures were held for reference or as shrines to the gods of the market place. Some macella had a water fountain or water feature in the centre of their courtyard as well as, or instead of, a tholos structure.

References

Ancient Roman buildings and structures
Food markets